Indian Telly Awards for Best Drama Series is an award given by IndianTelevision.com as a part of its annual Indian telly awards for TV serial recognize the Best Drama Series

Popular Award

Jury Award

References

External links
 Official Website

See also
 Indian Telly Awards
 11th Indian Telly Awards
 12th Indian Telly Awards

Indian Telly Awards